Ángel M. Lekumberri García (born 21 January 1970), also spelled Ángel Lekunberri, is a Spanish former footballer who played as an midfielder. In a career spanning almost two decades, he played with a variety of clubs in all of Spain's top four divisions, and made 199 appearances in La Liga during spells with Compostela and Osasuna, scoring six goals.

Club career
Lekumberri was born in Pamplona, the capital of the autonomous community of Navarre, but began his career with Asturian club Langreo. He made his debut in Segunda División B towards the end of the 1987–88 season, becoming a regular member of the team the following year. Langreo were relegated at the end of 1990–91, but Lekumberri left to join Athletic Bilbao. He spent three seasons with Bilbao, playing exclusively with their B team in the Segunda División. His strong performances earned him a move in the summer of 1994 to newly promoted La Liga side Compostela, and he made his top flight debut on 11 September in a 2–2 away draw with Real Oviedo at Estadio Carlos Tartiere.

He was a key part of the Compostela team for the whole of their four-year stay in the top division, before they were relegated after losing a playoff at the end of the 1997–98 season. He continued to represent the side for two seasons in the second tier, before returning to La Liga with his hometown club Osasuna in 2000. He enjoyed two strong seasons, but played only three times in the first half of 2002–03, so he left to join Levante in the January transfer window. Levante were promoted as Segunda División champions in 2003–04, but Lekumberri didn't make a single appearance in the league that year, and left the club at the end of the season.

After leaving Levante, Lekumberri returned to his first club, Langreo, who were now playing in the Tercera División. He spent two years with Langreo, and one with fellow Tercera División club Cudillero, before retiring in 2007 at the age of 37.

International career
Despite being born in Navarre, Lekumberri appeared once for the Basque Country representative side, in a 3–2 win over Morocco in 2000.

Personal life
Lekumberri's brother Francisco, younger by four years, was also a footballer. He played as a defender, and represented Siero in Segunda División B during the 2000–01 season.

Career statistics

Honours
Levante
Segunda División: 2003–04

References

External links

Ángel Lekunberri at Athletic Club

1970 births
Living people
Footballers from Pamplona
Footballers from the Basque Country (autonomous community)
Spanish footballers
Association football midfielders
Basque Country international footballers
La Liga players
Segunda División players
Segunda División B players
Tercera División players
UP Langreo footballers
Bilbao Athletic footballers
SD Compostela footballers
CA Osasuna players
Levante UD footballers